When shooting was reintroduced at the 1932 Summer Olympics in Los Angeles after being absent at the previous Games, it consisted of two events, one rifle event and one pistol event. The competitions were held on August 12, 1932 and August 13, 1932.

Medal summary

Participating nations
A total of 41 shooters from 10 nations competed at the Los Angeles Games:

Medal table

References

External links
 

 
1932 Summer Olympics events
1932
Olympics
Shooting competitions in the United States